Aannemers- en Timmerbedrijf Roozemond is a construction company in Stavenisse, Netherlands, the oldest family business in Zeeland province founded in 1650.

The services include:
construction of houses and roads
reconstruction, renovation, restoration
carpentry
mechanical woodworking, etc.

See also 
List of oldest companies

References 

Article contains translated text from Timmerbedrijf Roozemond on the Dutch Wikipedia retrieved on 25 February 2017.

External links 
Homepage
Location on Google Maps

Construction and civil engineering companies of the Netherlands
Companies established in the 17th century
17th-century establishments in the Dutch Republic